Kołaki may refer to the following places:
Kołaki, Masovian Voivodeship (east-central Poland)
Kołaki, Podlaskie Voivodeship (north-east Poland)
Kołaki, Warmian-Masurian Voivodeship (north Poland)